Bowin Glacier is a tributary glacier,  long, flowing northeast between Sullivan Ridge and Fulgham Ridge to enter Ramsey Glacier. It was named by the Advisory Committee on Antarctic Names for Commissaryman C.F. Bowin, U.S. Navy, Operation Deepfreeze, 1965 and 1966.

References 

Glaciers of Dufek Coast